Stenoglottis longifolia, called the long-leaved stenoglottis, is a species of orchid in the genus Stenoglottis, native to Mozambique, Eswatini, and KwaZulu-Natal in South Africa. It has gained the Royal Horticultural Society's Award of Garden Merit.

References

Orchideae
Flora of Mozambique
Flora of Swaziland
Flora of KwaZulu-Natal
Plants described in 1891